Alpha-N-acetylneuraminide alpha-2,8-sialyltransferase is an enzyme that in humans is encoded by the ST8SIA1 gene.

Gangliosides are membrane-bound glycosphingolipids containing sialic acid. Ganglioside GD3 is known to be important for cell adhesion and growth of cultured malignant cells. The protein encoded by ST8SIA1 is a type II membrane protein that catalyzes the transfer of sialic acid from CMP-sialic acid to GM3 to produce gangliosides GD3 and GT3. The encoded protein may be found in the Golgi apparatus and is a member of glycosyltransferase family 29.

In melanocytic cells, ST8SIA1 gene expression may be regulated by MITF.

References

Further reading